Calycadenia truncata is a species of flowering plant in the family Asteraceae known by the common name Oregon western rosinweed. It is native to western North America.

The hairy flower heads have a center of many purple-tipped disc florets as well a few yellow ray florets  in length. The fruit is an achene.

It is native to southwestern Oregon and northern and central California. It is found in the Cascades, the Coast Ranges, and the foothills of the Sierra Nevada as far south as Monterey and Tulare Counties. It thrives on dry and sunny grassy slopes.

References

External links
Jepson Manual Treatment
United States Department of Agriculture Plants Profile
Calphotos Photo gallery, University of California

truncata
Flora of California
Flora of Oregon
Plants described in 1836
Flora without expected TNC conservation status